Marco de Kock (born 1 May 1997) is a South African cricketer. He made his first-class debut for South Western Districts in the 2018–19 CSA 3-Day Provincial Cup on 25 October 2018. He made his List A debut for South Western Districts in the 2018–19 CSA Provincial One-Day Challenge on 28 October 2018.

References

External links
 

1997 births
Living people
South African cricketers
South Western Districts cricketers
Place of birth missing (living people)